Norpipanone (INN, BAN; Hexalgon) is an opioid analgesic related to methadone which was developed in Germany and distributed in Hungary, Argentina, and other countries. It had originally not been under international control but upon observation of case reports of addiction it was reviewed and shortly thereafter became a controlled substance. In the United States, it is a Schedule I controlled substance (ACSCN 9636, zero annual manufacturing quota as of 2014).  The salts in use are the hydrobromide (free base conversion ratio 0.806) and hydrochloride (0.902).

Synthesis

See also 
 Dipipanone
 Normethadone
 Valeronitrile

References 

Analgesics
Ketones
Opioids
1-Piperidinyl compounds